The 1990 French Open was a tennis tournament that took place on the outdoor clay courts at the Stade Roland Garros in Paris, France. The tournament was held from 28 May until 10 June. It was the 94th staging of the French Open, and the second Grand Slam tennis event of 1990.

Seniors

Men's singles

 Andrés Gómez defeated  Andre Agassi, 6–3, 2–6, 6–4, 6–4
It was Gómez's 3rd title of the year, and his 20th overall. It was his 1st (and only) career Grand Slam title.

Women's singles

 Monica Seles defeated  Steffi Graf, 7–6(8–6), 6–4
It was Seles' 6th title of the year, and her 7th overall. It was her 1st career Grand Slam title.

Men's doubles

 Sergio Casal /  Emilio Sánchez Vicario defeated  Goran Ivanišević /  Petr Korda, 7–5, 6–3

Women's doubles

 Jana Novotná /  Helena Suková defeated  Larisa Savchenko /  Natasha Zvereva, 6–4, 7–5

Mixed doubles

  Arantxa Sánchez Vicario /  Jorge Lozano defeated  Nicole Provis /  Danie Visser, 7–6(7–5), 7–6(10–8)

Juniors

Boys' singles
  Andrea Gaudenzi defeated  Thomas Enqvist 2–6, 7–6, 6–4

Girls' singles
  Magdalena Maleeva defeated  Tatiana Ignatieva 6–2, 6–3

Boys' doubles
  Sébastien Leblanc /  Sébastien Lareau defeated  Clinton Marsh /  Marcos Ondruska 7–6, 6–7, 9–7

Girls' doubles
  Ruxandra Dragomir /  Irina Spîrlea defeated  Tatiana Ignatieva /  Irina Sukhova 6–3, 6–1

Prize money

Total prize money for the event was $5,350,000.

References

External links
 French Open official website

 
1990 in French tennis
1990 in Paris